Mika Mäkelä (born 17 April 1971) is a Finnish judoka. He has had more success on national than international level achieving several medals in championship tournaments for senior judokas.

Achievements

References
 

1971 births
Living people
Finnish male judoka
Place of birth missing (living people)
20th-century Finnish people